John, Paul, George, Ringo ... and Bert is a 1974 musical by Willy Russell based on the story of the Beatles.

It premiered at the Everyman Theatre in Liverpool in May 1974, where it ran for eight weeks, and later moved to the Lyric Theatre in London in August 1974, where it ran for a year and was later named "Best Musical of 1974" by the Evening Standard Theatre Awards and London Critics' awards. It featured the music of the Beatles performed by Barbara Dickson.

It also briefly ran in Ireland in 1977 and in the United States in 1985.

Creative team
Directed by Alan Dossor
Design: Graham Barkmerth
Lighting: Mick Hughes
Sound: David Collison
Movement Consultant: Rufus Collings

Original London cast
Bert: George Costigan
John Lennon: Bernard Hill
Paul McCartney: Trevor Eve
George Harrison: Phillip Joseph
Ringo Starr: Anthony Sher
Brian Epstein, First Beatles Manager: Robin Hooper
Porter - Hilter - party guest - phone man...: Nick Stringer
Teddy Boy: Barry Woolgar
Teddy Boy: Dick Haydon
Teddy Boy: Ian Jentle
Tiny Tina: Luan Peters
Titular 1: Linda Beckett
Titular 2: Elizabeth Estensen
Titular 3 - TV reporter: Valerie Lilley
Singer and pianist: Barbara Dickson
Musicians: Robert Ash, Terry Canning

Album
An Original Cast Recording album was released by RSO Records.

Side One
"I Should Have Known Better" (Barbara Dickson)
"Your Mother Should Know" (Barbara Dickson)
"Ooee Boppa" (Tiny Tina & The Titular 3)
"With a Little Help from My Friends" (Barbara Dickson)
"Penny Lane" (Barbara Dickson)
"In the Bleak Midwinter" (Barbara Dickson)
"Here Comes The Sun" (Barbara Dickson)
"Long and Winding Road" (Barbara Dickson)

Side Two
"Clap and Cheer" (The Cast)
"Help" (Barbara Dickson)
"Lucy in the Sky" (Barbara Dickson)
"You Never Give Me Your Money"/"Carry That Weight" (Barbara Dickson)
"We Can Work It Out" (Barbara Dickson)
"I Will Be Your Love" (Leroy Lover - Bert)
"A Day in the Life" (Barbara Dickson)

Credits
Produced by Ian Samwell
Keyboards and vocals: Barbara Dickson
Fender bass guitar: Pete Zorn
Drums and percussion: Dave Mattacks (courtesy of Island Records)
Guitar: Kevin Peek
Additional vocals: Gerry Rafferty and Joe Egan (courtesy of A&M Records)
Horns and woodwinds arranged by Jimmy Horowitz and Ian Samwell 
Engineer: Dennis Weinreich

Reaction
According to an interview with Creem magazine, George Harrison stated that he saw the play with Derek Taylor and greatly disliked it. He walked out while attending the London premiere and withdrew permission to use his song "Here Comes the Sun". It was replaced with "Good Day Sunshine".

After excerpts from the play were broadcast on BBC television, Paul McCartney criticised it for being biased against him and in favour of John Lennon, objecting in particular to the suggestion that it was McCartney and not Lennon who was responsible for the break-up of the Beatles. McCartney blocked a proposed film version of the musical.

References

External links
Willy Russell site
Discogs

Musicals based on songs by the Beatles
1974 plays
Biographical musicals
Cultural depictions of John Lennon
British musicals
Musicals inspired by real-life events
Plays by Willy Russell
Jukebox musicals
Rock musicals